Moss Run is an unincorporated community in Washington County, in the U.S. state of Ohio.

History
A post office called Mossrun was established in 1857, and remained in operation until 1917. In 1881, Moss Run was one of 3 post offices in Lawrence Township.

References

Unincorporated communities in Washington County, Ohio
1857 establishments in Ohio
Populated places established in 1857
Unincorporated communities in Ohio